Homage (Old English) or Hommage (French) may refer to:

History
Homage (feudal) /ˈhɒmɪdʒ/, the medieval oath of allegiance
Commendation ceremony, medieval homage ceremony

Arts
Homage (arts) /oʊˈmɑʒ/, an allusion or imitation by one artist to another
Homage Comics, a comics imprint
Homage (sculpture), by Haydn Davies, created 1975 and destroyed in 2005

Music
Homage (Jimmy Somerville album), a Jimmy Somerville album
Homage, a 1992 album by the Blues Band
Hommage (album), a 1975 album by American jazz pianist Andrew Hill
Hommage, an album by Yannick Noah
Hommages, 1997 album by Nana Mouskouri

Film
 Hommage (film), a 2022 South Korean film

See also
Homage to Catalonia, a 1938 book by George Orwell